The 1961–62 St. John's Redmen basketball team represented St. John's University during the 1961–62 college basketball season. The team was coached by Joe Lapchick his seventeenth year at the school. This was St. John's first season playing their home games in Alumni Hall on the new Queens campus in Hillside, NY along with a few of their major games being played in Madison Square Garden in New York, NY.

They finished with a 21–5 record and a second-place finish in the 1962 National Invitation Tournament losing Dayton in the finals.

Roster

Schedule and results

|-
!colspan=9 style="background:#FF0000; color:white;"| Regular Season

|-
!colspan=9 style="background:#FF0000; color:#FFFFFF;"| NIT

References

St. John's Red Storm men's basketball seasons
St. John's
St. John's
St. John's Redmen basketball team 1961-62
St. John's Redmen basketball team 1961-62